HMS Penelope was a fifth-rate frigate of the Royal Navy, launched in 1798 and wrecked in 1815.

Career
Under Sir Henry Blackwood, she took part in the battle of 30 March 1800 against the Guillaume Tell, off the coast of Valletta, Malta. The British squadron off Malta comprised the 80-gun , the elderly 74-gun  and 64-gun  and the 36-gun Penelope. The squadron was supported by the brig .

The Guillaume Tell had put to sea in the evening of 30 March under the command of French Admiral Denis Decrès. She was sighted by crew aboard Penelope slightly before midnight, heading northeast. Blackwood ordered an immediate pursuit and sent word via Minorca to the rest of the fleet. A first broadside was fired at about 1am, but Guillaume Tell continued on her course without returning fire. By dawn, Penelope had again drawn within range of the larger French vessel, and Blackwood ordered a continued raking fire which brought down Guillaume Tells main and mizzen topmasts.

Penelopes sister ships Lion and Foudroyant hove into view shortly afterward, and engaged Guillaume Tell at close range, disabling her rigging and causing damage to her hull. Both British ships were badly damaged by the time Guillaume Tell struck her colours, and it was Penelope that took the French ship in tow and led her as a prize to Syracuse. Penelope lost two killed and two wounded in the battle. Blackwood was later commended for his gallantry and perseverance in initially engaging the French ship despite her larger size and firepower.

Because Penelope served in the navy's Egyptian campaign (2 March to 8 September 1801), her officers and crew qualified for the clasp "Egypt" to the Naval General Service Medal that the Admiralty authorised in 1850 for all surviving claimants.

From 1803, Penelope served in the English Channel under William Robert Broughton.

Fate
On 30 April 1815, Penelope, under James Galloway, ran aground near the Cap des Rosiers, British North America. She broke apart during the night, killing at least 40 of her crew. Many survivors subsequently froze to death. In all, 216 men drowned or froze to death. Sixty-six men and two women reached Douglastown two days later. The subsequent court-martial placed the master at the bottom of the list of seniority for failing to pay attention to the situation of the ship. Galloway and his First Lieutenant were reprimanded for the breakdown of discipline on board and on shore during the disaster; neither was employed again. One seaman received 500 lashes for insubordination, desertion, and being drunk. Some 48 men took the opportunity to desert.

References
Notes

Citations

References

External links 
 
  Wreck of HMS Penelope at Pointe-à-la-Frégate, 1841

Fifth-rate frigates of the Royal Navy
1798 ships
Shipwrecks in the Gulf of Saint Lawrence
Maritime incidents in 1815
Ships built in Hampshire